Masaka is a city in Uganda.

Masaka may also refer to:
 Masaka District, a district of Uganda
 Masaka, Nasarawa, a town in Nigeria
 Masaka, Rwanda, a neighbourhood in the city of Kigali, Rwanda
 Masaka people, or Aikanã, an ethnic group of Brazil
 Masaka language, or Aikanã, a language of Brazil
 Masaka (character), a Star Trek character
 Masaka (horse), a racehorse

See also 
 Masaka Hospital (disambiguation)
 Massaka (disambiguation)

Language and nationality disambiguation pages